The Laxey Wheel (also known as Lady Isabella) is built into the hillside above the village of Laxey in the Isle of Man. It is the largest surviving original working waterwheel in the world.

History
The wheel was built in 1854 to pump water from the Glen Mooar part of the Great Laxey Mines industrial complex. It was named "Lady Isabella" after the wife of Lieutenant Governor Charles Hope, who was the island's governor at that time.

The wheel is currently maintained by Manx National Heritage as part of the Great Laxey Wheel & Mines Trail.

The wheel features today on the reverse side of the £20 notes issued by the Isle of Man Government.

Technical details
A water-powered wheel was used because the Isle of Man does not have a supply of coal for a steam-powered pump.

Water from the surrounding area – including a number of local springs and streams – is collected in a cistern, which is above the level of the top of the wheel. A closed pipe connects the cistern to the top of the wheel; thus the water flows up the tower as an inverted syphon. The water falls from the pipe into the buckets (formed from wooden slats on the circumference) and makes the wheel rotate in what is described as the 'reverse' direction: it is a backshot wheel. This rod runs along the rod viaduct to the pumping shaft 200m away where the  stroke is converted by a T-rocker into a pumping action.

Most of the wheel and rod is made of wood; however, key mechanical parts are metal to provide tension and bearing surfaces. The rod has attached wheels at intervals to permit the stroke's motion with minimal friction.

Dimensions
 Diameter: 72 ft 6 in. (22.1 m)

Mine

The mine employed over 600 miners at its peak, producing lead, copper, silver and zinc, until it closed in 1929. In 1965 the Manx Government bought the wheel and site. The wheel was restored; in 1989, it was put under the control of Manx National Heritage.

Musical wheel
The wheel has two pieces of music dedicated to it: one penned by Stuart Slack, and the other by Helen Barley; both are entitled The Laxey Wheel.

See also
 Snaefell Wheel
 Great Laxey Mine Railway
 Great Snaefell Mine
 Great Laxey Mine

References

External links

IOMGuide.com/LaxeyWheel Illustrated and with visitor prices.

Water wheels in the Isle of Man
Buildings and structures completed in 1854